Darian Stevens (born October 29, 1996) is an American freestyle skier. She competed for the United States Olympic team at the 2018 Winter Olympics in Pyeongchang and the 2022 Winter Olympics in Beijing.

Early life 
Darian Stevens was born in Missoula, Montana. Stevens has one brother. She began skiing at age 4. She attended Westminster College.

Career 
Stevens competes as a skier in both halfpipe and slopestyle. Stevens placed sixth at the U.S. Grand Prix/FIS World Cup during the 2011–2012 season. Stevens missed the chance to compete at the 2014 Winter Olympics by one spot. Stevens is one of four female slopestyle skiers named to the U.S. team for the 2018 Winter Olympics in Pyeongchang.

References 

American female freestyle skiers
1996 births
Living people
Freestyle skiers at the 2018 Winter Olympics
Freestyle skiers at the 2022 Winter Olympics
Olympic freestyle skiers of the United States
21st-century American women